Thomas van Wanrooij (born 20 November 2002) is a Dutch Paralympic swimmer. He represented the Netherlands at the 2020 Summer Paralympics.

Career
van Wanrooij represented the Netherlands at the 2020 Summer Paralympics in the 200 metre individual medley SM13 event and won a bronze medal.

References

2002 births
Living people
Swimmers from Rotterdam
Dutch male medley swimmers
Paralympic swimmers of the Netherlands
Swimmers at the 2020 Summer Paralympics
Medalists at the 2020 Summer Paralympics
Paralympic bronze medalists for the Netherlands
Paralympic medalists in swimming
Medalists at the World Para Swimming Championships
S13-classified Paralympic swimmers